Andre Agassi defeated Pete Sampras in the final, 7–6(7–5), 7–5, 6–1 to win the men's singles tennis title at the 2001 Indian Wells Masters.

Àlex Corretja was the defending champion, but lost in the third round to Patrick Rafter.

Seeds

  Gustavo Kuerten (third round)
  Marat Safin (first round)
  Pete Sampras (final)
  Andre Agassi (champion)
  Magnus Norman (first round)
  Lleyton Hewitt (semifinals)
  Yevgeny Kafelnikov (semifinals)
  Àlex Corretja (third round)
  Thomas Enqvist (second round)
  Tim Henman (third round)
  Patrick Rafter (quarterfinals)
  Juan Carlos Ferrero (first round)
  Arnaud Clément (third round)
  Dominik Hrbatý (first round)
  Mark Philippoussis (first round)
  Sébastien Grosjean (third round)

Draw

Finals

Top half

Section 1

Section 2

Bottom half

Section 3

Section 4

References
 2001 Indian Wells Masters Draw

2001 Indian Wells Masters
Indian Wells Masters